Events from the year 1827 in the United States.

Incumbents

Federal Government 
 President: John Quincy Adams (DR/NR-Massachusetts)
 Vice President: John C. Calhoun (D-South Carolina)
 Chief Justice: John Marshall (Virginia)
 Speaker of the House of Representatives: John W. Taylor (DR-New York) (until March 4), Andrew Stevenson (D-Virginia) (starting December 3)
 Congress: 19th (until March 4), 20th (starting March 4)

Events
 February 28 – The Baltimore and Ohio Railroad is incorporated, becoming the first railroad in America offering commercial transportation of both people and freight.
 March 12 – In Brown v. Maryland, the United States Supreme Court ruled that imported goods in their original package are under federal jurisdiction and thus not subject to state regulation.
 March 16 – Freedom's Journal, the first African-American owned and published newspaper in the United States, is founded in New York City by John Russwurm.
 May 21 – The Maryland Democratic Party is founded by supporters of Andrew Jackson in Baltimore and hosts its first meeting at the Baltimore Atheneum.
 September 3 – Ho-Chunk leader Red Bird surrenders to U.S. officials, ending the Winnebago War.
 J. J. Audubon's The Birds of America commences publication in the United Kingdom.
 The original Delmonico's restaurant opens in Manhattan.
 The first English translation of Christopher Columbus' journal by Samuel Kettell is published in Boston.
 John Neal opens the first public gymnasium in the United States founded by an American in Portland, Maine.

Births
 January 17 – Samuel Hartt Pook, Boston naval architect (died 1901)
 February 17 – Rose Terry Cooke, fiction writer and poet (died 1892)
 March 25 – Stephen Luce, admiral (died 1917)
 April 10 – Lew Wallace, Union general in the American Civil War, politician and novelist (died 1905)
 May 10 – William Windom, U.S. Senator from Minnesota from 1870 to 1881 and from 1881 to 1883 (died 1891)
 May 21 – William P. Sprague, Ohio politician (died 1899)
 May 23 – Milton Latham, U.S. Senator from California from 1860 to 1863 (died 1882)
 May 27 – Samuel F. Miller, politician (died 1892)
 June 7 – Alonzo J. Edgerton, U.S. Senator from Minnesota in 1881 (died 1896)
 June 9 – Francis Miles Finch, judge, poet and academic (died 1907)
 June 10 – Thomas W. Ferry, U.S. Senator from Michigan from 1871 to 1883 (died 1896)
 July 11 – Austin Corbin, railroad executive and robber baron (died 1896)
 July 13 – Hugh O'Brien, 31st Mayor of Boston, Massachusetts (died 1895)
 July 19 – Orville H. Platt, U.S. Senator from Connecticut from 1879 to 1905 (died 1905)
 August 3 – John Williams Tobey, architect, carpenter and builder (died 1909)
 August 6 – George Franklin Drew, 12th Governor of Florida (died 1900)
 September 18 – John Townsend Trowbridge, author (died 1916)
 September 26 – Daniel W. Voorhees, U.S. Senator from Indiana from 1877 to 1897 (died 1897)
 September 28 – Aaron A. Sargent, journalist and lawyer, U.S. Senator from California from 1873 to 1879 (died 1887)
 September 30 – Ellis H. Roberts, politician (died 1918)
 October 12 – Josiah Parsons Cooke, chemist (died 1894)
 October 13 – Robert Crozier, U.S. Senator from Kansas from 1873 to 1874 (died 1895)
 November 10 – J.T. Wamelink, Dutch-born composer (died 1910)
 November 26 – Ellen G. White, née Harmon, Adventist (died 1915)
 Date unknown – Asahel C. Beckwith, U.S. Senator from Wyoming in 1893 (died 1896)

Deaths
 February 22 – Charles Willson Peale, portrait painter (born 1741)
 February 23 – Felipe Enrique Neri, Texas legislator, colonizer (born 1759)
 April 24 – Israel Pickens, U.S. Senator from Alabama from 1821 to 1825 (born 1780)
 April 29
 Rufus King, lawyer, politician and diplomat (born 1755)
 Deborah Sampson, first American female soldier (born 1760)
 May 29 – Carlos Wilcox, poet (born 1794)
 September 23 – Freeman Walker, U.S. Senator from Georgia from 1819 to 1821 (born 1780)
 October 12 – John Eager Howard, politician (born 1752)
 November 10 – St. George Tucker, lawyer and poet (born 1752 in Bermuda)
 November 25 – Enoch Fenwick, Jesuit priest (born 1780)

See also
Timeline of United States history (1820–1859)

References

External links
 

 
1820s in the United States
United States
United States
Years of the 19th century in the United States